Bruce Edward Walton (June 14, 1951 – October 18, 2019) was an American professional football player who was an offensive lineman in the National Football League (NFL) for the Dallas Cowboys. He played college football for the UCLA Bruins.

Early years
Walton was the oldest son of Ted and Gloria Walton and was born in San Diego, California. He attended Helix High School where he played football and basketball. He accepted a football scholarship from the University of California, Los Angeles.

He was named a starter as a sophomore. As a senior, he helped his team rush for 3,810 yards and score 38 rushing touchdowns—both school records at the time, while blocking for All-American running back Kermit Johnson. 

He was a three-year starter at offensive tackle and graduated with the school record for consecutive starts (32).

Professional career
Walton was selected in the fifth round (126th overall) of the 1973 NFL draft by the Dallas Cowboys. As a rookie, he appeared in seven games, backing up the guard and tackle positions, while seeing most of his playing time on special teams. He returned one kickoff for 11 yards.

In 1974, he was the backup at left tackle behind Rayfield Wright. He appeared in 13 games, starting against the Houston Oilers in place of an injured Wright.

In 1975, he continued his special teams and backup duties. He injured his knee against the Green Bay Packers and missed 2 games. He played in Super Bowl X and with Bill Walton, became the only brother combination to ever play in the Super Bowl and in the NBA finals.

In 1976, he did not report to the team and retired because of a knee injury.

Personal life
Walton is the older brother of NBA hall of famer Bill Walton. After his playing career was over, Bruce Walton managed the 98.1 KIFM radio station in the San Diego area. He introduced the "lites out" smooth jazz format. In 1996, his company sold KIFM to the Jefferson Pilot group for $28.75 million. In 2002, Walton joined Terramar Retail Center as vice president for development overseeing Seaport Village. He was named a Director for Competitor Group (CGI) in 2012.

He played a football player in the Walt Disney film Gus.

In 2017, Walton suffered a bout of the flu that ended up causing brain injuries and kidney failure. He managed to recover in time for his daughter Harmony's wedding in May 2019. Walton died on October 18, 2019.

References

1951 births
2019 deaths
Players of American football from San Diego
American football offensive guards
American football offensive tackles
UCLA Bruins football players
Dallas Cowboys players